Northumberland Street is a street in Newcastle upon Tyne, England.

Northumberland Street may also refer to:
Northumberland Street, London, London
Luxborough Street, formerly Northumberland Street, London

See also
Northumberland Avenue, London